Binder may refer to:

Businesses
 Binder FBM, a former German jewelry manufactory
 Binder Dijker Otte & Co., the expansion of "BDO" in BDO International

Computing
 Binder Project, package and share interactive, reproducible environments
 File binder, software that binds files into one executable
 Microsoft Binder, a discontinued Microsoft Office application
 OpenBinder, a system for inter-process communication

Geography
 Binder, Khentii,  a district of Khentii Province in eastern Mongolia
 Binder, an abandoned village in Germany at the site of Hunnesrück

Stationery
 Binder (rubber band)
 Binder clip, a small device for holding together sheets of paper
 Ring binder, a device to hold together multiple sheets of paper with punched-in holes

Other uses
 Binder (material), any material or substance that holds or draws other materials together
 Binder (surname), a surname
 Binder Twine Festival, an annual festival in Kleinburg, Ontario
 Phosphate binder, a medication used to reduce the absorption of phosphate
 Reaper-binder, a type of farm equipment
 A garment or bandage used for breast binding
 A base class in the role-playing game Dungeons & Dragons
 Insurance Binder, a contract of a temporary insurance policy
 The film-forming component of paint

See also 
 Binding (disambiguation)
 Bind (disambiguation)